Buleleng is a regency (kabupaten) of Bali, Indonesia. It has an area of 1,365.88 km2 and population of 624,125 at the 2010 census and 791,910 at the 2020 census. Its regency seat is at the town of Singaraja.

Buleleng was founded as a kingdom by Gusti Panji Sakti, who ruled c. 1660-c. 1700. He is commemorated as a heroic ancestor-figure who expanded the power of Buleleng to Blambangan on East Java. The kingdom was weakened during its successors, and fell under the suzerainty of the neighbouring Karangasem kingdom in the second half of the 18th century. It was headed by an autonomous branch of the Karangasem Dynasty in 1806–1849.

The Dutch attacked Buleleng in 1846, 1848 and 1849, and defeated it on the last occasion. Buleleng was incorporated in the Dutch colonial system and lost its autonomy in 1882. In 1929 a descendant of Gusti Panji Sakti, the renowned scholar Gusti Putu Jelantik, was appointed regent by the Dutch. He died in 1944, during the Japanese occupation of Indonesia. His son was a well-known novelist, Anak Agung Nyoman Panji Tisna. In 1947,  Anak Agung Pandji Tisna surrendered the throne to his younger brother, Anak Agung Ngurah Ketut Djelantik, known as Meester Djelantik, until 1950. In 1949-50 Buleleng, like the rest of Bali, was incorporated in the unitary republic of Indonesia.

Administrative districts

The regency is divided into nine districts (kecamatan), tabulated below with their areas and population totals from the 2010 census and the 2020 census. The table also includes the number of administrative villages (rural desa and urban kelurahan) in each district and its postal codes.

The administrative centres of each district have the same name as the district itself, except for the Buleleng District (of which the centre is Singaraja, which also serves as the administrative capital of the whole regency) and Sawan District (of which the centre is Sangsit). Gerokgak District includes the small offshore island of Pulau Menjangan Kecil.

Airports
Lt.Col. Wisnu Airfield is located in the Sumberkima village.

Research of a new airport was completed in 2017, due to the congestion of Ngurah Rai International Airport. The new two-runway airport will be built in the east part of Buleleng Regency and will be connected by railway to the existing airport.
Kubutambahan, 15 kilometers east of Singaraja, was decided to be the new airport site over two other candidates, Sangsit and Gerokgak, after taking into account geographical conditions, wind speed, wind direction, and other factors.

Pearl producers
Many big pearl producers have developed 130.9 hectares in Gerokgak village as an area for pearl breeding and world-class pearl productions. It will enlarge to 250 hectares swath of water stretching from Gerokgak to Kubutambahan.

Gallery

References

External links
 
 
 
  

 
Hindu Buddhist states in Indonesia
17th century in Indonesia
18th century in Indonesia
19th century in Indonesia
1660 establishments in Asia
1882 disestablishments in Asia
17th-century establishments in Indonesia